Beverly Baldwin Martin (born August 7, 1955) is a former United States circuit judge of the United States Court of Appeals for the Eleventh Circuit and a former United States District Judge of the United States District Court for the Northern District of Georgia.

Early life and education
Born in Macon, Georgia, Martin graduated from Stratford Academy in 1973 before attending Mercer University for one year from 1972 to 1973. She subsequently transferred to Stetson University and received a Bachelor of Arts degree in 1976. She earned a Juris Doctor from University of Georgia School of Law in 1981.

Professional career
Martin was in private practice with the firm of Martin Snow, LLP in Georgia from 1981 to 1984, and was also an assistant attorney general in the State Law Department of the Office of Attorney General of Georgia from 1984 to 1994. She was an Assistant United States Attorney for the Middle District of Georgia from 1994 to 1997 and United States Attorney for the Middle District of Georgia from 1997 to 2000.

Federal judicial service

Northern District of Georgia
On the recommendation of Senator Max Cleland, Martin was nominated on March 27, 2000, by President Bill Clinton to a seat on the United States District Court for the Northern District of Georgia vacated by George Ernest Tidwell. She was confirmed by the United States Senate on June 16, 2000, and received her commission on August 3, 2000. Her service terminated on February 1, 2010, due to elevation to the Eleventh Circuit.

United States Court of Appeals for the Eleventh Circuit
On June 19, 2009, President Barack Obama nominated Martin to a seat on the United States Court of Appeals for the Eleventh Circuit vacated by Judge R. Lanier Anderson III, who assumed senior status on January 31, 2009. The United States Senate confirmed Martin's nomination by a 97–0 vote on January 20, 2010. She received her commission on January 28, 2010. 

She retired from active service on September 30, 2021. On October 4, 2021, Martin became the executive director at the New York University School of Law's Center on Civil Justice.

Notable decision as a circuit judge
In November 2020, Martin dissented when the majority found that a municipality’s ban on minor conversion therapy violated the First Amendment to the United States Constitution.

References

Sources

1955 births
Living people
20th-century American judges
20th-century American women lawyers
20th-century American women judges
20th-century American lawyers
21st-century American judges
21st-century American women judges
Assistant United States Attorneys
Judges of the United States Court of Appeals for the Eleventh Circuit
Judges of the United States District Court for the Northern District of Georgia
People from Macon, Georgia
Stetson University alumni
United States Attorneys for the Middle District of Georgia
United States court of appeals judges appointed by Barack Obama
United States district court judges appointed by Bill Clinton
University of Georgia alumni